The 1929 Chattanooga Moccasins football team represented the University of Chattanooga as a member of the Southern Intercollegiate Athletic Association (SIAA) during the 1929 college football season. First-year head coach  Harold Drew led the team to the SIAA championship.

Schedule

References

Chattanooga
Chattanooga Mocs football seasons
Chattanooga Moccasins football